Neotephritis is a genus of tephritid  or fruit flies in the family Tephritidae.

Species
Neotephritis bruesi (Bates, 1933)
Neotephritis cancellata (Wulp, 1900)
Neotephritis cinerea (Blanchard, 1852)
Neotephritis finalis (Loew, 1862)
Neotephritis mundelli (Lima, 1936)
Neotephritis nigripilosa Hardy, 1980
Neotephritis paludosae Hardy, 1980
Neotephritis quadrata (Malloch, 1933)
Neotephritis rava Foote, 1960
Neotephritis semifusca (Wulp, 1900)
Neotephritis staminea (Wulp, 1900)
Neotephritis thaumasta (Hering, 1942)

References

Tephritinae
Tephritidae genera
Diptera of North America
Diptera of South America